Saskia de Brauw (born 19 April 1981) is a Dutch artist and model. She began modeling at sixteen but quit after one year to attend art school in Amsterdam. Returning to modeling at the age of 29, she quickly became a successful fashion model. Notable appearances include Carine Roitfeld's final cover for French Vogue (2011) and a starring role in David Bowie's 2013 music video The Stars (Are Out Tonight).  Her photographs of found objects have been exhibited at the National Museum of Scotland. She and her husband, photographer and filmmaker Vincent van de Wijngaard, collaborate on multimedia projects that include his photographs and her writing.

Career
After an early start in the fashion world, de Brauw left modeling at 16 to pursue her interest in art, studying the subject at the Gerrit Rietveld Academie in her home town of Amsterdam. Returning to modeling at age 29, she appeared in fashion shows for Balenciaga and Givenchy and became a "new face" for Chanel; photographed by Mert and Marcus for Carine Roitfeld's final cover of Vogue Paris in March 2011; and the same month featuring on the cover of Vogue Italia, photographed by Steven Meisel.

She has appeared in editorials for Italian, American, French, British, German, Russian, Japanese, Korean, and Chinese Vogue, Harper's Bazaar, W, i-D, LOVE, V, Numéro, Dazed, and Interview. She has appeared on the covers of Italian, French, German, Dutch, Russian, Japanese, and Korean Vogue, Dutch Elle, Numéro, V, i-D, and Dazed.

She has walked the runways for Lanvin, Céline, Marc Jacobs, Bottega Veneta, Versace, Thierry Mugler, Prada, Giles Deacon, Hugo Boss, Balmain, Jean Paul Gaultier, Stella McCartney, Donna Karan, Fendi, Emilio Pucci, Jason Wu, Diane Von Furstenberg, Altuzarra, Givenchy, Max Mara, Chanel, Louis Vuitton, Isabel Marant, Yves Saint Laurent, Loewe, Sonia Rykiel, Armani Privé, Hermés, Balenciaga, Rick Owens, Tom Ford, Roberto Cavalli, Anna Sui, Derek Lam, Dolce & Gabbana, Narciso Rodriguez, and Miu Miu.

De Brauw has appeared in advertising campaigns for GIADA, Moschino, Chanel, Giorgio Armani, Loewe, Max Mara, Calvin Klein, Fendi, Prada, Lanvin, Karl Lagerfeld, Yves Saint Laurent, Givenchy, Moncler, Zara, Missoni, Louis Vuitton, DSquared2, Paul Smith, Bottega Veneta, Versace, H&M, Fossil, Bergdorf Goodman, and Barneys New York. . In 2023 Saskia became the face of Roberto Cavalli Spring collection campaign. 

In 2013, she appeared alongside Andreja Pejić, Tilda Swinton, Iselin Steiro and David Bowie for Bowie's 2013 single "The Stars (Are Out Tonight)" as one of the "stars".

In her art, De Brauw explores the relationship between the physical body and its surroundings. Her work encompasses both photography and installation, as well as written verse and prose. During the 2014 Edinburgh International Fashion Festiva, de Brauw's enlarged photographs of discarded objects became the basis for an exhibition The Accidental Fold at the National Museum of Scotland. In 2016, she published a book based on that exhibition.

In 2015, de Brauw began a collaboration with her husband, photographer and filmmaker Vincent van de Wijngaard, that included a film of De Brauw walking a north–south route through Manhattan from 225th Street to Battery Park, during a single day in May. This work resulted in 2018 in a multimedia exhibition Ghosts Don’t Walk in Straight Lines.

De Brauw and de Wijngaard live in upstate New York, where they continue to collaborate on multimedia projects.

References

External links
 Blog
 Official website

 

1981 births
Living people
Dutch artists
Dutch female models
Artists from Amsterdam
Place of birth missing (living people)